Martha Angélica Romo Jiménez (born 27 August 1961) is a Mexican politician currently who is a member of the National Action Party, a conservative political party. She served as Deputy of the Mexican Congress during the LX Legislature representing the state of Jalisco.

References

1961 births
Living people
Politicians from Jalisco
Women members of the Chamber of Deputies (Mexico)
Members of the Chamber of Deputies (Mexico)
National Action Party (Mexico) politicians
21st-century Mexican politicians
21st-century Mexican women politicians
Deputies of the LX Legislature of Mexico